Spasskoye is a rural locality (a settlement) in Nikiforovskoye Rural Settlement, Ustyuzhensky District, Vologda Oblast, Russia. The population was 248 as of 2002. There are 8 streets.

Geography 
Leushino is the nearest rural locality.

References 

Rural localities in Ustyuzhensky District